Rapid T. Rabbit and Friends was an independently produced puppet and variety show created and produced by Richard Concepcion. The show was cablecasted weekly on public access cable TV in New York City since February 21, 1983. until the show creator's passing in 2017. The show ran on the public-access television cable TV channels of the Manhattan Neighborhood Network, Queens Public TV, and aired online every Sunday afternoon over the Pawpet Broadcasting Network before the Funday Pawpet Show.

The show, which is based in Rapid Transit Rabbit's hometown of New York City. Follows him, and his friends Cuppy, Rupert and Mejeep, both in town, and around the country on their adventures. This could be in the form of puppets interacting with each other via a traditional puppet stage, or in the form of a video documentary. In recent years the show expanded to include Rapid as a mascot, as well as a puppet which was used to film video documentaries for the show. Throughout the years, the Rapid T. Rabbit character has attended many events such as the Ocean City, New Jersey Doo-Dah Parade, and the Long Island Ducks Mascot Day among others including the New York City Easter Parade. While Rapid T. Rabbit was a very involved with local events in the New York City area, he was commonly mistaken as the "Easter Bunny" by kids according to an interview with Richard in the New York Times. 
Rapid also made appearances on various other television shows including The Daily Show with Jon Stewart in 1999 and with local fandoms including the Chuck E. Cheese and ShowBiz Pizza fandom (from 2004 until 2013) at "Cheesevention", as well as in the Furry Fandom at conventions such as Anthrocon  and Midwest Furfest as a Guest of Honor in 2000. Richard Concepcion, the producer and puppeteer of Rapid T. Rabbit, died on August 1, 2017 according to the official homepage in his apartment due to natural causes, thus ending the shows run.

In 2011 the program was the subject of a featured exhibition at the Museum of the Moving Image.

Main Cast

Rapid Transit Rabbit - Host
Cuppy - Co-Host
Mejeep The Meeping Ferret - Co Host
Rupert - Supporting Character and Rapid's puppet nephew

Special guest appearances by

T.H.E. Fox
Greg the Bunny
Cody Coyote
Dr. Demento
Looney Bird
Frank Sidebottom
Tenderheart Bear and Bedtime Bear of The Care Bears
Orwin Raccoon
Mr. Rat from The Mr. Bear Today Show
Rattus T. Rat
Sandy the Seagull of the Brooklyn Cyclones
Scooter the Holy Cow of the Staten Island Yankees
Reggy from the Mascot Hall of Fame
Soupy Sales
Larry Storch
Joe Franklin
Arnold Stang
Blitzer T. Wolf
Bugs Bunny
Chuck E. Cheese
Paddington Bear
Telly Monster from Sesame Street
Kermit Love
Oscar The Grouch from Sesame Street

References

External links 
 
Rapid T. Rabbit's entry on WikiFur

1983 American television series debuts
2017 American television series endings
1980s American television series
1990s American television series
2000s American television series
Television series about rabbits and hares
American television shows featuring puppetry
American public access television shows